Brian Jordan Jr. is an American actor, singer and dancer with many off-broadway and regional theatre credits. He trained at NYU's Tisch School of the Arts and The Debbie Allen Dance Academy. Currently, he is starring as Maurice Webb on Tyler Perry’s Sistas on BET. Jordan is  a native of Baton Rouge, Louisiana and a product of Southeastern Louisiana University. He has had film roles in Bolden!: The Buddy Bolden Story, Get On Up!, and also in the new BET holiday film, Christmas Belles.

Film

Television

References

External links

 
  
 

21st-century American male actors
African-American male actors
American male film actors
American male television actors
Living people
Southeastern Louisiana University alumni
1991 births
Tisch School of the Arts alumni